Lyuban is a town in Tosnensky District of Leningrad Oblast, Russia, located on the Tigoda River  southeast of St. Petersburg. Population:  The median age is 40.9 and the population of Lyuban is 53.5% female.

History
It was first mentioned in the 15th century as a trade settlement. In 1851, a railway station was built and the development of the settlement of Lyuban-Gorka, serving the railway station started. On June 3, 1917, Lyuban-Gorka was granted town status and renamed Lyuban. Lyuban was a part of Novgorodsky Uyezd of Novgorod Governorate.

On August 1, 1927, the uyezds were abolished and Lyubansky District, with the administrative center in Lyuban, was established. The governorates were also abolished and the district became a part of Leningrad Okrug of Leningrad Oblast. On August 15, 1930, the okrugs were abolished as well and the districts were directly subordinated to the oblast. On August 19, 1930, Lyubansky District was abolished and Lyuban became a part of newly established Tosnensky District. Between September 1941 and January 1944, during World War II, Lyuban was occupied by German troops.

Administrative and municipal status
Within the framework of administrative divisions, it is, together with twenty-five rural localities, incorporated within Tosnensky District as Lyubanskoye Settlement Municipal Formation. As a municipal division, Lyubanskoye Settlement Municipal Formation is incorporated within Tosnensky Municipal District as Lyubanskoye Urban Settlement.

Economy

Industry
The main industrial enterprise is a lumber plant.

Transportation

The Saint Petersburg – Moscow Railway and the M10 Highway, connecting Moscow and St. Petersburg, run through the town. Lyuban is also connected by roads with Luga and with Kirovsk via Mga.

Culture and recreation
Lyuban contains two cultural heritage monuments of federal significance and additionally eight objects classified as cultural and historical heritage of local significance. The federal monuments are the tombs of Pavel Melnikov and Alexey Bolotov, engineers coordinating the construction of the railway. The tomb of painter Andrei Ryabushkin at the same cemetery is protected as a cultural monument of local significance.

See also
Chudovo (air base)

References

Notes

Sources

Cities and towns in Leningrad Oblast
Novgorodsky Uyezd
Tosnensky District